A'annepada was a king of the First Dynasty of Ur, circa 2600 BCE. He was a son of Mesannepada. It is thought that his tomb may be tomb PG 580 in the Royal Cemetery at Ur.

Votive tablets
Several tablets are known that bear his name, in particular dedicated to Ninhursag, and proclaiming Mesannepada as his father:

Foundation cone

A foundation cone in a copper alloy was found in Ur, bearing the name of "King A'annepada" in a dedication for Inanna, now in the British Museum (BM 90951).

The cone was discovered by John George Taylor in 1854 during his excavations in Ur. It has a length of 34.3 centimetres, and a diameter of 3.7 centimetres, and weighs 1.7 kilograms. According to the British Museum, it was found together with two other objects, a carved stone with handle and a lapis lazuli portrait, which together probably formed a foundation deposit.

The actual content of the inscription had been overlooked, until it was published by J.C. Gadd in 1928.

Artifacts from tomb PG 580 at Ur
It has been suggested that the tomb of A'annepada may be tomb PG 580 in the Royal Cemetery at Ur.

References

|-

26th-century BC Sumerian kings
First Dynasty of Ur
Sumerian kings